Fawley railway station is a disused stone built railway station that served the village of King's Caple in Herefordshire on Hereford, Ross and Gloucester Railway. The station had two platforms each with its own brick built waiting rooms, and a small goods yard. It was situated just south of Fawley Tunnel. It closed, along with the line, on 2 November 1964.

The station platforms still remain today, although overgrown.

References

Further reading

External links
Fawley on a navigable 1946 O. S. map

Former Great Western Railway stations
Disused railway stations in Herefordshire
Railway stations in Great Britain opened in 1855
Railway stations in Great Britain closed in 1964
Beeching closures in England